River is a Canadian thriller film directed by Jamie M. Dagg. It premiered in the Discovery section of the 2015 Toronto International Film Festival. The film was chosen as the winner of the Academy of Canadian Cinema and Television's Claude Jutra Award, as the year's best feature film directed by a first-time director. Rossif Sutherland garnered a Canadian Screen Award nomination for Best Actor at the 4th Canadian Screen Awards.

Plot
John Lake (Rossif Sutherland) is an American doctor working in Laos. After he intervenes to stop the sexual assault of a young woman, the assailant is found dead the next morning — thus leaving Lake open to charges of murder if he cannot prove his innocence, and forcing him on the run back to the American embassy in Vientiane.

Cast
 Rossif Sutherland as John Lake
 Douangmany Soliphanh as Douangmany
 Sara Botsford as Dr. Stephanie Novella
 Ted Atherton as Patrick Reardon
 David Soncin as Simon
 Aidan Gillett as Lachlan
 Vithaya Pansringarm as The Bartender

References

External links
 
 

2015 films
2015 thriller films
2015 directorial debut films
Canadian thriller films
English-language Canadian films
Best First Feature Genie and Canadian Screen Award-winning films
Films set in Laos
French-language Canadian films
2010s English-language films
2010s Canadian films